Don Chera is a 2006 Indian Tamil language action crime film directed by K. S. Saravanan. The film stars Ranjith and Sujibala, with Chandrasekhar, S. Rajasekar, Ilavarasu, Meera Krishnan, Velmurugan and R. N. R. Manohar playing supporting roles. The film, produced by N. T. Sakthi Pandiyan, was released on 2 June 2006. It is a remake of the Hindi film Vaastav: The Reality (1999).

Plot
The jobless and carefree young man Cheran (Ranjith) lives with his parents (Chandrasekhar and Meera Krishnan) and his elder brother Ravi (Ramesh Maali). His father wants him to find a job, and Cheran sets up a roadside street food business along with his friends. One day, an exchange with a customer escalates, and Cheran has to kill him to save his friend Kutty (Velmurugan). The killed customer turns out to be the brother of the rowdy Ezhumalai (V. K. R. Ragu).

Cheran and Kutty have no choice but to hide from the police, and they then meet Ezhumalai's archenemy "Royapuram" Bava (R. N. R. Manohar) who promises to offer them protection. Kamal Bhai (S. Rajasekar), a pious man who solves underworld crime issue, arranges a meeting between Cheran and Ezhumalai. During the meeting, Ezhumalai, who is full of rage, tries to kill Cheran, but Cheran takes a gun and shoots him dead. "Royapuram" Bava then hires Cheran and Kutty as his henchmen. Cheran starts drinking alcohol, gets addicted to drugs, and spends his nights in a brothel, where he meets the young prostitute Geetha (Sujibala). Cheran slowly begins to rise in "Royapuram" Bava's ranks. When "Royapuram" Bava gets killed by his enemies, a vengeful Cheran kills them all. Cheran becomes the most dangerous don of Chennai, and he is now called Don Chera by his henchmen. In the meantime, Cheran and Geetha fall in love with each other, and they get married with the blessings of their parents.

Cheran then starts working for the home minister Perumal (Ilavarasu), who orders him to kill innocent people. Thereafter, Geetha gives birth to a baby boy. His family advises Cheran to leave the criminal underworld and to surrender to the police, but Cheran refuses. Perumal is soon under serious pressure from the public and government. They suspect him of employing Cheran. He orders the police to encounter Cheran. his friend Kutty and his henchmen get killed in an encounter. Cheran, who is now on the run, must protect his family as they, too, are in danger. Kamal Bhai arranges a meeting between Cheran and Perumal; Cheran kills Perumal as he would spoil others' lives like his in the future. In the process, Kamal Bhai is killed by the police, and Cheran escapes from the place. Cheran returns to his home and asks his family to save him. Cheran, who could not sleep peacefully since he entered the criminal underworld, begs his mother to make him sleep, and Dhanalakshmi shoots him dead.

The film ends with the family fulfilling the annual rites of Cheran on the Chennai beach and with Dhanalakshmi explaining all that happened to her young grandson.

Cast

Ranjith as Cheran (Don Chera)
Sujibala as Geetha
Chandrasekhar as Sundaram, Cheran's father
S. Rajasekar as Kamal Bhai
Ilavarasu as Perumal
Meera Krishnan as Dhanalakshmi, Cheran's mother
Velmurugan as Kutty
R. N. R. Manohar as "Royapuram" Bava
P. Soundara Rajan as Kunji Chetta
Vasu Vikram
V. K. R. Ragu as Ezhumalai
Pasi Sathya as Kutty's mother
Jayashree as Sindhu
Shanthi Ganesh
Seetha Ravishankar
Nisha
Balendran
Ramesh Maali as Ravi
Sathya as Sathya
Tirupur Ramasamy as Kutty's father
Bava Lakshmanan as Murugesan

Production

K. S. Saravanan, who had worked with various directors, including Keyaar and Vikraman, made his directorial debut with Don Chera under the banner of Sivasankaralaya. Ranjith was selected to play the title role, while Sujibala was chosen to play his love interest. Sivamanoharan took in charge of cinematography while newcomer Prince G. who worked with Harris Jayaraj as his keyboard player, had taken care of the music and editing was done by R. T. Annadurai. Speaking about the film, the director said, "It is a movie certainly different from other films on gangsters. Not just the story and the script, but the making itself would be totally different from other films. The whole cast and crew have given their best".

Soundtrack

The film score and the soundtrack were composed by Prince  G.. The soundtrack features 5 tracks.

Release

Initially, the film had its release date fixed on 26 May 2006, but it was postponed to 2 June 2006 to avoid a clash with Selvaraghavan's gangster film Pudhupettai (2006).

Balaji Balasubramaniam of bbthots.com called it a "weak remake of Sanjay Dutt's Vaastav" and wrote, "Ranjith overacts almost throughout [..] Susi Bala is introduced pretty late but is adequate in the few scenes where she is required to emote. Ilavarasu plays a villain for a change and manages to utter a few comments in his trademark style without letting his character lose its evil nature". Indiaglitz said, "From start to finish, this gangster movie has ripped off some scene from every other gangster movie. So there is little novelty ore novelty. The director's other major failing, it would seem, is in not wresting compelling performances from his cast. Leading with Ranjith, everyone hams outrageously and the film is left adrift for lack of feel". Another reviewer praised Ranjith's acting and gave the film a mixed review.

References

2006 films
2000s Tamil-language films
Films set in Chennai
Films shot in Chennai
Films about organised crime in India
Indian gangster films
Indian crime action films
Indian crime drama films
2006 directorial debut films
2000s crime action films
2006 crime drama films